Mikael Hestdahl (13 November 1890 – 13 October 1918) was a Norwegian wrestler. He competed in the featherweight event at the 1912 Summer Olympics. He was killed in the Meuse-Argonne Offensive during World War I.

References

External links
 

1890 births
1918 deaths
Olympic wrestlers of Norway
Wrestlers at the 1912 Summer Olympics
Norwegian male sport wrestlers
People from Hordaland
American military personnel killed in World War I
Norwegian emigrants to the United States
Sportspeople from Vestland